Kurniati Kamalia or better known as Titi Kamal (born in Jakarta, Indonesia on 7 December 1981) is an Indonesian actress and model of Malay descent.

Biography
Kurniaty Kamalia was born in Jakarta on 7 December 1981 to Kamal Badri from Palembang and Elly Rosniati of Bengkulu, both of Malay descent; she is the youngest of the couple's five children. She started modelling in the 1990s. In 1997, she was Aneka magazine's cover girl of the year.

In 2002, Kamal played a high school student alongside Dian Sastrowardoyo in Ada Apa dengan Cinta? (What's Up with Love?). This led to her becoming "one of the most sought-after young actresses" in the country. The following year she had minor role in Eiffel I'm in Love / Eiffer Aku Sedang Jatuh Cinta as the girlfriend of the male lead, played by Samuel Rizal; Kamal's character ultimately plays second fiddle to the female lead, played by Shandy Aulia. In the scene in which Kamal's character Intan arrives in Paris, slow motion reminiscent of Halle Berry's introduction in Die Another Day is used; Kamal was introduced in a similar manner in several subsequent films.

In 2005, Kamal played in several television serials, including Hantu Jatuh Cinta (Ghosts Falling in Love) and Pura-pura Buta (Pretending to be Blind). That same year, she opened the first in a chain of restaurants. In 2006, Kamal starred as a pop rocker turned dangdut singer in Mendadak Dangdut (Suddenly Dangdut).

In 2008, Kamal performed in D.O. (Drop Out) as a sexually deprived, socially awkward teacher. She modeled her character on women in similarly themed comedies such as The Art of Seduction and Good Luck Chuck. That same year she performed in Hanung Bramantyo's Doa yang Mengancam (The Threatening Prayer) as a poor prostitute; while preparing for the role, she paid a poor woman for the right to follow the woman and see how she dealt with life.

On 20 February 2009 Kamal released her debut music album. Titled Lebih Baik Sendiri, the album featured a duet with Anji, the lead vocalist of Drive. In 2010 she released a single entitled "Happy".
She is the "current" face / brand ambassador for Ultima II cosmetics: http://ultimaii-indonesia.com/category/ultima-ii-brand-ambassador/

Style
Kamal kept her hair long and straight for ten years, due to contractual obligations with hair product companies. In 2010, coinciding with the launch of a new single, she changed her style to a ponytail. She prefers not to act in horror movies, considering them low brow. Instead, she chooses movies that she is likely to watch herself.

Personal life
Kamal married actor Christian Sugiono in Perth, Australia, on 6 February 2009. The couple had two wedding receptions, one in Australia and the other in Jakarta.

Filmografi

Awards and nominations

References
Footnotes

Bibliography

External links
 

1981 births
Indonesian people of Malay descent
21st-century Indonesian actresses
21st-century Indonesian women singers
Indonesian Muslims
Indonesian female models
Singers from Jakarta
Actresses from Jakarta
Living people